Shamrock Mills, also known as Hanes Hosiery Mill #1, is a historic textile mill building located at Winston-Salem, Forsyth County, North Carolina.  It was built in 1911, and is a one-story brick building with daylight basement.  It is six bays deep and extends in seven sections with a rhythmic saw-tooth roof and six-foot skylights.  An addition was built in 1925. It was the first building used by the Hanes Hosiery Company. The mill closed in 1926, and the building subsequently housed a Cadillac dealership.  The building houses the Sawtooth School for Visual Art.

It was listed on the National Register of Historic Places in 1978.

References

External links
Sawtooth School for Visual Art website

Textile mills in North Carolina
Industrial buildings and structures on the National Register of Historic Places in North Carolina
Industrial buildings completed in 1911
Buildings and structures in Winston-Salem, North Carolina
National Register of Historic Places in Winston-Salem, North Carolina
1911 establishments in North Carolina
Hanes family